The 2021 Rugby Europe Sevens Trophy was the second division of Rugby Europe's 2021 sevens season. This edition was hosted by the cities of Zagreb and Budapest on 19–20 June and 10–11 July. The two highest-placed teams were promoted to the 2022 Championship series. The two teams with the fewest points were relegated to the 2022 Conference.

The Czech Republic won the competition and was promoted to the Championship along with second place finishers Belgium. Denmark and Turkey were relegated to the Conference.

Schedule

Standings

Zagreb 

All times in Central European Summer Time (UTC+02:00)

Pool Stage

Pool A

Pool B

Pool C

Knockout stage

9th Place

5th Place

Cup

Budapest 

All times in Central European Summer Time (UTC+02:00)

Pool Stage

Pool A

Pool B

Pool C

Knockout stage

9th Place

5th Place

Cup

External links 
 Tournament 1 page
 Tournament 2 page

Notes

References

2021 rugby sevens competitions
2021 in Croatian sport
2021 in Hungarian sport
Sport in Zagreb
International sports competitions in Budapest
June 2021 sports events in Croatia
July 2021 sports events in Hungary